Diploderma chapaense is endemic to Vietnam.

References

Diploderma
Reptiles of Vietnam
Reptiles described in 1937
Taxa named by René Léon Bourret